Catenochytridium carolinianum is a species of fungus in the genus Catenochytridium. It is the type species of the genus.

References

External links

Chytridiomycota
Fungi described in 1939